Francis Bates Pond was a Republican politician from the state of Ohio. He was Ohio Attorney General from 1870 to 1874.

Pond  was born August 9, 1825, at Ellisburg, Jefferson County, New York. He entered Oberlin College in Oberlin, Ohio, in 1841, and graduated with honors in 1846. He spent the next three years in Kent, Ohio, one year as a teacher and two as a book-keeper for Charles and Marvin Kent. In 1850 he went to Harmar, Ohio and taught classics at the Harmar Academy. He began study of law in 1849 in Cleveland, and continued in Marietta in 1850. He was admitted to the bar 1852 at Malta, Ohio, and three years later elected Prosecuting Attorney of Morgan County, Ohio. During the Civil War, he served as a colonel with the Sixty-second Ohio Infantry, and August, 1864, at the Battle of Deep River, he was wounded, and lost sight in his left eye. He resigned in November of that year.

In 1867, he was elected to represent Morgan County in the Ohio House of Representatives for the Fifty-eighth General Assembly. In 1869 and 1871 he won election as Ohio Attorney General. In 1879 he was elected to the Ohio Senate from the Fourteenth district (Washington, Morgan and part of Noble County), for the Sixty-fourth General Assembly, and re-elected to the Sixty-fifth in 1881.

He died November 2, 1883, at his home in Malta, Ohio. He died as a result of the wound he received near his eye in the Civil War which he had suffered with for nineteen years.

Pond was married to Eliza A. Corner of Malta in 1854. She died on January 13, 1866. On May 21, 1867, he married his first wife's sister, Emma. She died March 18, 1870. He married Janet Alexander of Washington County, Pennsylvania in 1876. His first wife had children named Mary Blanche and George Charles. His second wife had a son named Francis Newell, who died in infancy.

Notes

References

People from Malta, Ohio
Union Army colonels
Ohio Attorneys General
Ohio lawyers
Republican Party members of the Ohio House of Representatives
Republican Party Ohio state senators
Oberlin College alumni
1883 deaths
People of Ohio in the American Civil War
Ohio Constitutional Convention (1873)
County district attorneys in Ohio
1825 births
People from Ellisburg, New York
19th-century American politicians
19th-century American lawyers